1993 Dakar Rally also known as the 1993 Paris–Dakar Rally was the 15th running of the Dakar Rally event. 154 competitors started the rally, which returned to its original route. The rally was won by Bruno Saby and Dominique Seriyes; Stephane Peterhansel won the motorcycle class for the third time.

References

Dakar Rally
Paris-Dakar
1993 in French motorsport
1993 in African sport